Superstar was a weekly prime time musical variety show formerly broadcast in the Philippines by the Radio Philippines Network and hosted by Nora Aunor from 1967 to 1989.

Hosts

Main host
Nora Aunor

Co-hosts
German Moreno (1975–1989)
Cherie Gil (1984–1989) 
Jay Manalo (1986–1989)
Jograd de la Torre (1987–1989)

Critical response
In 1987, Henry C. Tejero of the Manila Standard named the series as the best musical variety show of 1987, stating that over the years, the series became "a compendium of musical and visual styles in local television. Superstar is the chronicle of Aunor's rise and fall and ultimate apotheosis as The Phenomenon."

See also
Radio Philippines Network
Nora Aunor
List of programs previously broadcast by Radio Philippines Network

References

1975 Philippine television series debuts
1989 Philippine television series endings
1970s Philippine television series
1980s Philippine television series
Philippine variety television shows
Radio Philippines Network original programming
Intercontinental Broadcasting Corporation original programming